Pleasant Hill is a neighborhood of Mulberry, Arkansas, United States, which was once a separate community. Pleasant Hill is the nearest community to the Mulberry River Bridge, which is listed on the National Register of Historic Places.

References

Populated places in Crawford County, Arkansas
Neighborhoods in Arkansas